Jean-Claude "J.C." Ngando Mbende (born 20 November 1999) is a professional footballer from Cameroon. He plays as a midfielder and was selected by Vancouver Whitecaps as the fifth overall pick in the 2023 MLS SuperDraft.

Early life
Born in Douala, Cameroon, Ngando moved to France at the age of seven where he would go on to play second team football for Paris FC and Amiens SC. With football in Europe suspended by the COVID-19 pandemic and no professional contract he evaluated his options and decided to look for a new opportunity which he later called “the best decision of my life”. He then attended University of North Carolina Greensboro after being assisted into a scholarship by the FFFUSA programme. He was named the 2021 South Conference Freshman of the Year, and in 2022 was the South Conference Player of the Year, and he was chosen for both the NCAA Division I All American First Team and All-South Region First Team. In 2021 he had scored 5 goals in 15 appearances, and in 2022 in 23 matches Ngando scored 4 goals and was credited with 14 assists.

Career
At the 2023 MLS SuperDraft Vancouver traded with Houston Dynamo the No. 13 pick as well as $225,000 in General Allocation Money ($125,000 in 2023, $100,000 in 2024) in order to get the fifth round pick with which they chose Ngando. He was given a Generation Adidas contract and had the honour of being the highest ever drafted player from the UNCG programme.

References

External links

1999 births
Association football midfielders
Living people
Amiens SC players
Paris FC players
Vancouver Whitecaps FC draft picks
Vancouver Whitecaps FC players
Cameroonian footballers
Cameroonian expatriate footballers
Footballers from Douala
UNC Greensboro Spartans men's soccer players
USL League Two players